Jeffery may refer to:

 Jeffery (name), including a list of people with the name
 Jeffery (automobile), an early American automobile manufacturer
 Thomas B. Jeffery Company
 Jeffery Boulevard, a major north–south street on the South Side of Chicago
 Jeffery armored car
 Jeffery (mixtape), by rapper Young Thug

See also
 Jeffrey (disambiguation)
 Jefferies (disambiguation)
 Jeffries, a surname
 Jeffers, a surname
 Geoffrey (disambiguation)